Donald Sterling Palmer Howard, 3rd Baron Strathcona and Mount Royal (14 June 1891 – 22 February 1959) was a Conservative Party politician in the United Kingdom.

Life and career
He was the son of Robert Jared Bliss Howard and Margaret Howard, 2nd Baroness Strathcona and Mount Royal. He studied at Eton and Trinity College, Cambridge.

He was elected at the 1922 general election as Member of Parliament (MP) for Cumberland North and held the seat until 1926, when he succeeded to the peerage on the death of his mother.  She had inherited the title from her father, the first Baron, the title having been created with a special remainder to allow female succession.

He served in the 1930s National Government as Captain of the Yeomen of the Guard from 1931 to 1934, and as Under-Secretary of State for War from 1934 to 1939.

Marriage and family
On 25 October 1922, he married The Honourable Diana Evelyn Loder, daughter of Gerald Loder, 1st Baron Wakehurst, and Lady Louise de Vere Beauclerk, a daughter of William Beauclerk, 10th Duke of St Albans.

They had five children:
 Donald Euan Palmer Howard, 4th Baron Strathcona and Mount Royal (26 November 1923 – 18 June 2018)
 The Hon. Barnaby John Howard (23 November 1925 – 18 December 2011)
 An unnamed daughter (31 October 1927 – 3 November 1927)
 The Hon. Jonathan Alan Howard (born 15 November 1933)
 The Hon. Diana Catriona Howard (born 13 March 1935)

On his death in 1959, he was succeeded in the peerage by his eldest son, Euan.

See also 
 Bell Telephone Memorial
 Canadian Hereditary Peers

References 

ThePeerage.com

External links 
 

1891 births
1959 deaths
Barons in the Peerage of the United Kingdom
Canadian peers
Howard, Donald
Conservative Party (UK) hereditary peers
Ministers in the Chamberlain peacetime government, 1937–1939
Howard, Donald
Howard, Donald
Howard, Donald
UK MPs who inherited peerages
War Office personnel in World War II